Manus Naval Base  was a number of bases built after the World War II Battle of Manus by United States Navy on the Manus Island and a smaller island just east, Los Negros Island in the Admiralty Islands chain. The major naval base construction started with the Los Negros landings on February 28, 1944. The Navy repaired and did the expansion of the airfields on the Admiralty Islands. United States Navy Seabee built or repaired the facilities on the islands.  The large Manus Naval Base, also called the Admiralty Island base, supported United States Seventh Fleet, Southwest Pacific command, and part of the Pacific Fleet. The base was abandoned by the US Navy after the war.

History
Japanese called Los Negros Island the Hyane Island and had built some facilities on the two islands. Manus Island was picked for a major air and sea base as it was near Empire of Japan strong points: 387 miles to Rabaul, 694 miles to Truk, 273 miles Kavieng and 244 miles to Wewak. The other reason was Manus Island's Seeadler Harbor, which offered the largest and most protected Southwest Pacific fleet anchorage. By March 1944 the beaches were secured enough that the Seabees started construction. The first airfield captured was Hyane Airfield which was renamed Momote Airfield. While the airfield was captured the outlining area still had fighting and the airfield was attacked two times while under construction. Hyane Airfield has one 4,000-foot runway in poor condition. On March 10, fighter planes began using the Momote Airfield. Seabees completed all Momote Airfield construction and improvements on June 1, 1944 and turned the 7,800-feet runway Momote Airfield over to the United States Army Air Forces. The newly built air base had a camp, 90 fighters and 80 bombers, a tank farm with 17,000-barrel aviation gasoline that was filled from a small T1 tanker harbor and an ammunition depot. On April 1, 1944 Seabees started construction at Mokerang Airfield on Los Negros Island with the US Army engineers. The existing runway was improved to 8,000 feet and a new second 8,000 feet runway was built. Built at Mokerang Airfield were: a base camp, supply depot, repair depot, and a 30,000-barrel tank farm. At Hyane Harbor Seabees constructed a 500-bed evacuation hospital for the US Army. For the US Navy, at Hyane Harbor Seabees built a waterfront complex: two cargo ship wharves, a repair pier, 800-foot ship refueling pier, and a ship unloading and repair crane. Also starting on June 19, 1944, at Hyane Harbor was a pontoon assembly depot, as it was found that shipping pontoon flat, unassembled took a lot less space in ships. The pontoon depot had a personnel camp and warehouses. For the US Army and Navy a large aviation supply depot was built. For the Navy a 5,000 runway was built and a 7,000-barrel aviation-gasoline tank farm. To support the activity at Hyane Harbor a small-boat repair depot and camp was built.  As the built up in the Pacific continued in April 1944, two new camp constructions were started on Los Negros Island: Papitalai Point and one at Lombrum Point.  At Papitalai Point Seabee 58th Battalion built a base camp, depot, a PT boat overhaul base, fuel oil and diesel tank farm. Seabee started work at Lombrum Point on April 17, 1944, which become Lombrum Naval Base.  At Lombrum Point Seabee built seaplane repair base, a ship repair base, and a Landing craft repair base. Each base required the building of camps, depots, piers and shops. Landing craft base supported LCT, LSM, and a host of smaller landing craft. For ship repair, different sized Auxiliary floating drydocks were towed to the base. The largest USS AFDB-2 and USS ABSD-4 were able to drydock battleships. Also at Lombrum Point Seabee built a seaplane base with a concrete seaplane ramp and 8,000-barrel tank farm. At the captured coastal Lorengau Airfield a large supply depot was built. Lorengau Airfield was a 3,500-foot grass runway and due to lack of space, it was not improved, but a support camp and depot was built at the Lorengau Airfield.  Navy Base headquarters was built at Lorengau, near the mouth of Lorengau River. At the Lorengau Navy Base Seabee built a 1,000-bed Navy Hospital 15. The headquarters also had a camp for 5,000 men incoming Troops. Pityilu Airfield, on Pityilu Island was built to support aircraft carriers, with a training center and storage of 350 spare fighter planes for later aircraft carrier use. Ponam Airfield on Ponam Island was also built to support aircraft carrier fighter planes. After the war, most bases were abandoned in 1946 and 1947. Momote Airfield became Momote Airport. Some bases were turned over to the Royal Australian Navy and later to the Papua New Guinea Defence Force.

Bases and facilities
 Seeadler Harbor Large  fleet anchorage (some times called Manus Island Harbor or Manus Harbor) 
Lombrum Seaplane Base, with PBY Catalina, G-21 Goose, PBM Mariner (VPB-71, VPB-52), VP-33 and VPB-34 PBY-1 Patrols and air-sea rescue, and FAW-17 Patrol and Reconnaissance
 PT Boat Base
Submarine chaser base
Pityilu Island fleet recreation center for up to 10,000 troops.
 Lombrum Naval Base (HMPNGS Tarangau)  
Advanced Base Construction Depot (ABCD) - Seabee Camp
Mokerang, floating Liberty ship dock, a fixed Liberty dock, and a pile dock
LST landing beach
USS Hope (AH-7), USS Bountiful (AH-9) and USS Refuge (AH-11) hospital ships
Lorengau Naval Depot
Naval Air Station Receiving station, Lorengau
Salami, communication center
Koruniat Island,  on 4 April 1944, the 5th Cavalry established a base on this island.
Crash boat base
Ammunition depots
Base and Fleet Headquarters
Post office FPO# 3205 SF Manus Island
Quartermaster depot
Medical center
128 storage depot buildings
50 refrigerator storage units
5 miles of road
Water-supply systems able to produce 4,000,000 gallons per day
Many piers and Pontoons docks
Sawmill
Coral quarries for fill
Power Plants
Radar Stations
Mess halls
 Tankers: USS Caribou, USS Alameda, USS Arethusa, USS Leopard and USS Armadillo
*Repair Base
Major ship repair base with Large auxiliary floating drydock USS ABSD-4 and ASDB-2

USS ARD-19 Floating dry dock
USS White Sands (ARD-20)
Service Squadron - Lombrum 
Part depots - Lombrum 
Machine shops
Engineering camp 
Chemical Engineering Camp 
Motor pool
USS Argonne (AS-10)
USS Mindanao (ARG-3)
USS Medusa (AR-1)
USS Briareus (AR-12)
USS Vestal
USS Cebu (ARG-6)
USS Fortune (IX-146)
USS Aviation, parts ship 
USS Piedmont (AD-17)
USS Sierra (AD-18)
USS Whitney (AD-4)
USS Amycus
USS Current (ARS-22)
USS Apache (ATF-67)
USS Chimaera (ARL-33)
USS Currituck (AV-7)
USS Creon (ARL-11)
USS Oyster Bay (AGP-6)
USS Euryale
USS Tangier (AV-8)
USS San Pablo (AVP-30)
USS Willoughby (AGP-9)
USS Wright (AV-1)

Airfields
Mokerang Airfield two 8,000 feet bomber runways, Army and Navy use.
Momote Airfield (Hyane Airfield) 7,800-feet foot runway, turned over to US Army, after war Momote Airport.
Lorengau Airfield 3,500 foot grass runway, not used, became supply depot.
NAS Ponam Airfield on Ponam Island was built by the US Navy in June 1944. This was an aircraft carrier flighter plane overhaul base,  has one coral-surfaced 5,000 foot runway. Ponam Airfield did anti-submarine warfare patrols. Later became HMS Nabaron, after the US Navy closed base on September 1, 1947.
Based at Ponam Airfield was:
78th Naval Construction Battalion 
140th Battalion
ACORN 28 - Seabee unit 
VMF-312 (24 x FG Vought F4U Corsair unit) 
VP-130 (15 Lockheed Ventura [PV-1] unit) 
VC-75 (Grumman F4F Wildcat unit) 
Carrier Aircraft Service Unit 42
Carrier Aircraft Service Unit 13
Carrier Aircraft Service 587 
Mobile Naval Air Base 4, (Royal Navy)
NAS Pityilu Airfield, on Pityilu Island Built by US Navy in 1944, 5,500 feet runway. aircraft carrier fighter plane training base, with storage of 350 spare planes. Complete camp for 5,000 troops. Was later transferred to the Royal Navy, camp is at    
Based at Pityilu Airfield was:
VPB-146 (PV-1, Lockheed Ventura unit) 
ACORN 28
VJ-2 (JM-1 detachment Able, Martin B-26 Marauder unit)
Carrier Aircraft Service Unit 42 
Carrier Aircraft Service Unit 13
US Navy 5,000 foot x 150 feet runway with 7,000-barrel aviation-gasoline storage
VR-13 Naval Air Transport Service, Brisbane to Manus, with R4D-5 and RY-2 planes
VPB-117 with PB4Y-1 Liberators
VB-106 with PB4Y-1 Liberators

Attacks and lose
USS Mount Hood (AE-11), an ammunition ship, exploded on November 10, 1944 in Seeadler Harbor. The 350 men on the ship were killed. She damaged nearby ships, like the USS Mindanao which had 180 crewmen killed and injured by the explosion.
USS ABSD-4 was attacked on April 22, 1945, Mitsubishi A6M Zero thought that the large floating dock was an aircraft carriers and damaged the dry dock.
USS AFDB-2  was attacked on April 22, 1945 also, damaging section G.

Seabees units

Seabees working on Manus Naval Base:
2nd Naval Construction Regiment: 11th, 58th and 71st Naval Construction Battalion
5th Naval Construction Regiment: 35th, 44th, and 57th Battalions

40th Battalion
46th Battalion
78th Battalion
17th Battalion
58th Battalion
104th Battalion
20th Special Battalion
21st Special Battalion
22nd Special Battalion
63rd Battalion
140th Battalion
561 Construction Battalion
587 Construction Battalion
621 Construction Battalion
PAD 1 - Navy Pontoons Battalion

Post war
On January 1, 1950 Royal Australian Navy (RAN) founded HMAS Seeadler, HMPNGS Tarangau (PNG Defence Force Base Lombrum) at the former US Naval Base. The new base replace the older base at Dreger Harbour, near Finschhafen. to replace the RAN base at Dreger Harbour, near Finschhafen. The base was renamed HMAS Tarangau, the name of the former Dreger Harbour base, on 1 April 1950.

Monument 1st Calvary Division Memorial - Los Negros
Remains AFDB / ABSD Auxiliary Floating Dry Dock 2 - Los Negros
Remains AFDB / ABSD Auxiliary Floating Dry Dock 4 
Ship wreck  Wrecks LCVP Landing Crafts - Los Negros
Ship Wreck "USS Mount Hood (AE-11)" - Los Negros
Japanese Shipwreck - Los Negros .

Gallery

See also

U.S. Naval Base Subic Bay
Espiritu Santo Naval Base
US Naval Advance Bases
Naval Advance Base Saipan
Manus Regional Processing Centre

External links
1944 U.S. Military Film "The Admiralty Islands" Capture & Occupation Of  Manus & Los Negros
 youtube Manus Island is Important Pacific Base. Australian Diary 72.
youtube "They Came To An Island" U.S. Navy Civil Engineer Corps Wwii Seabees Construction Battalions 29564

References

Military installations closed in the 1940s
Closed installations of the United States Navy
Manus Naval Base
Manus Province
Seabees
World War II sites in Papua New Guinea